The calorie is a unit of energy that originated from the obsolete caloric theory of heat.  For historical reasons, two main definitions of "calorie" are in wide use.  The large calorie, food calorie, dietary calorie, or kilogram calorie was originally defined as the amount of heat needed to raise the temperature of one kilogram of water by one degree Celsius (or one kelvin).  The small calorie or gram calorie was defined as the amount of heat needed to cause the same increase in one gram of water. Thus, 1 large calorie is equal to 1000 small calories. 

In nutrition and food science, the term calorie and the symbol cal almost always refers to the large unit. It is generally used in publications and package labels to express the energy value of foods in per serving or per weight, recommended dietary caloric intake, metabolic rates, etc.  Some authors recommend the spelling Calorie and the symbol Cal (both with a capital C) to avoid confusion; however, this convention is often ignored.

In physics and chemistry the word calorie and its symbol usually refer to the small unit; the large one being called kilocalorie.  However, this unit is not officially part of the metric system (SI), and is regarded as obsolete, having been replaced in many uses by the SI unit of energy, the joule (J).

The precise equivalence between calories and joules has varied over the years, but in thermochemistry and nutrition it is now generally assumed that one (small) calorie (thermochemical calorie) is equal to exactly 4.184 J, and therefore  one kilocalorie (one large calorie) is 4184 J, or 4.184 kJ.

History

The term "calorie" was first introduced by Nicolas Clément, as a unit of heat energy, in lectures on experimental calorimetry during the years 1819–1824.  This was the "large" calorie. The term (written with lowercase "c") entered French and English dictionaries between 1841 and 1867. It comes .

The same term was used for the "small" unit by Pierre Antoine Favre (Chemist) and Johann T. Silbermann (Physicist) in 1852.  This unit was used by U.S. physician Joseph Howard Raymond, in his classic 1894 textbook A Manual of Human Physiology.  He proposed calling the "large" unit "kilocalorie", but the term didn't catch on until some years later.

In 1879, Marcellin Berthelot distinguished between gram-calorie and kilogram-calorie, and proposed using "Calorie", with capital "C", for the large unit. This usage was adopted by Wilbur Olin Atwater, a professor at Wesleyan University, in 1887, in an influential article on the energy content of food.

The small calorie (cal) was recognized as a unit of the CGS system in 1896, alongside the already-existing CGS unit of energy, the erg (first suggested by Clausius in 1864, under the name ergon, and officially adopted in 1882).

Already in 1928 there were serious complaints about the possible confusion arising from the two main definitions of the calorie and whether the notion of using the capital letter to distinguish them was sound.

The joule was the officially adopted SI unit of energy at the ninth General Conference on Weights and Measures in 1948. The calorie was mentioned in the 7th edition of the SI brochure as an example of a non-SI unit.

The alternate spelling  is considered nonstandard and dated.

Definitions
The "small" calorie is broadly defined as the amount of energy needed to increase the temperature of 1 gram of water by 1 °C (or 1 K, which is the same increment, a gradation of one percent of the interval between the melting point and the boiling point of water). The amount depends on the atmospheric pressure and the starting temperature, and different choices of these parameters have resulted in several different precise definitions of the unit.

The two definitions most common in older literature appear to be the 15 °C calorie and the thermochemical calorie. Until 1948, the latter was defined as 4.1833 international joules; the current standard of 4.184 J was chosen to have the new thermochemical calorie represent the same quantity of energy as before.

Usage

Nutrition
In a nutritional context, the "large" unit is used almost exclusively. It is generally written "calorie" with lowercase "c" and symbol "cal", even in government publications, although the capitalized form "Calorie" (with symbol "Cal") or the name "kilocalorie" (with symbol "kcal") are also used, and may be mandated by law. The SI unit of energy kilojoule (kJ) may be used instead, in legal or scientific contexts.

In the United States, most nutritionists prefer the unit kilocalorie to the unit kilojoules, whereas most physiologists prefer to use kilojoules. In the majority of other countries, nutritionists prefer the kilojoule to the kilocalorie.

On nutrition facts labels in the European Union, energy is expressed in both kilojoules and kilocalories. In the United States and Canada, labels use "Calories", referring to the large unit. In China, only kilojoules are given.

Food energy
The unit is most commonly used to express food energy, namely the specific energy (energy per mass) of metabolizing different types of food.  For example, fat (lipids) contains 9 kilocalories per gram (kcal/g), while carbohydrates (sugar and starch) and protein contain approximately 4 kcal/g. Alcohol in food contains 7 kcal/g.  The "large" unit is also used to express recommended nutritional intake or consumption, as in "calories per day". 

Dieting is the practice of eating food in a regulated way to decrease, maintain, or increase body weight, or to prevent and treat diseases such as diabetes and obesity. As weight loss depends on reducing caloric intake, different kinds of calorie-reduced diets have been shown to be generally effective.

Chemistry and physics
In other scientific contexts, the term "calorie" and the symbol "cal" almost always refers to the small unit; the "large" unit being generally called "kilocalorie" with symbol "kcal". It is mostly used to express the amount of energy released in a chemical reaction or phase change, typically per mole of substance, as in kilocalories per mole. It is also occasionally used to specify other energy quantities that relate to reaction energy, such as enthalpy of formation and the size of activation barriers. However, it is increasingly being superseded by the SI unit, the joule (J); and metric multiples thereof, such as the kilojoule (kJ). 

The lingering use in chemistry is largely due to the fact that the energy released by a reaction in aqueous solution, expressed in kilocalories per mole of reagent, is numerically close to the concentration of the reagent, in moles per liter, multiplied by the change in the temperature of the solution, in kelvin or degrees Celsius.  However, this estimate assumes that the volumetric heat capacity of the solution is 1 kcal/L/K, which is not exact even for pure water.

See also

Basal metabolic rate
Caloric theory
Conversion of units of energy
Empty calorie
Food energy
A calorie is a calorie
Nutrition facts label
British Thermal Unit

References

Units of energy
Heat transfer
Non-SI metric units